The Red Girl is a 1908 American black-and-white short silent Western film directed by D. W. Griffith for the American Mutoscope & Biograph Company. It stars Florence Lawrence and the cast includes Charles Inslee, George Gebhardt, D. W. Griffith, Mack Sennett and Linda Arvidson.

Plot
An Indian girl helps a Mexican woman who has stolen a bag of gold nuggets belonging to a girl miner. The Mexican woman seduces the Indian girl's husband and tortures her. She escapes and meets the posse looking for the thief. Her husband and the woman are escaping downstream in a canoe so the posse launch other canoes and give chase. A fight ensues with the canoes capsizing and the Mexican woman taken prisoner. The Indian girl's husband pleads with her to forgive him but she refuses and goes away with the girl miner.

Cast
 Florence Lawrence as The Red Girl
 Charles Inslee as The Red Girl's Husband

Others (not all confirmed)
 Linda Arvidson as Woman in Second Bar
 Clara T. Bracy
 George Gebhardt as Indian / Man in First Bar / Man in Second Bar
 D. W. Griffith as Man on Footpath
 Arthur V. Johnson
 Anthony O'Sullivan
 Mack Sennett as Man in First Bar / Man in Second Bar
 Harry Solter as Bartender
 Marion Sunshine

References

External links
 

1908 films
1908 short films
1908 Western (genre) films
American silent short films
American black-and-white films
Films directed by D. W. Griffith
Silent American Western (genre) films
1900s American films
1900s English-language films